Trichomycteridae is a family of catfishes commonly known as pencil catfishes or parasitic catfishes. This family includes the candiru fish (Vandellia cirrhosa), feared by some people for its alleged habit of entering into the urethra of humans.  They are one of the few parasitic chordates. Another species is the life monsefuano (Trichomycterus punctulatus) which was important to the Moche culture and still an important part of Peruvian cuisine.

This family is prohibited from being imported into various parts of the United States.

Taxonomy
The Trichomycteridae comprise about 42 genera and 286 species described. It is the second-most diverse family of the superfamily Loricarioidea. Numerous species still remain undescribed.

The monophyly of Trichomycteridae is well-supported. The family is divided into eight subfamilies. The only subfamily that is not monophyletic is the largest one, Trichomycterinae. A large clade within Trichomycteridae is also suggested that includes the subfamilies Tridentinae, Stegophilinae, Vandelliinae, Sarcoglanidinae and Glanapteryginae (the so-called TSVSG clade); this large clade in turn forms a larger monophyletic group with the two genera Ituglanis and Scleronema. The latter two genera are not classified in any of the subfamilies. The basal subfamilies Copionodontinae and Trichogeninae are sister groups to each other, and together they form a clade that is sister to the rest of the Trichomycteridae.

Subfamilies and genera include:

Distribution
Trichomycteridae has the greatest distribution of any catfish family. It is widely distributed throughout the Neotropics. These fish originate from freshwater in Costa Rica, Panama, and throughout South America. The family extends from Panama southward to Chile and Argentina.

Description
The bodies of these fish are normally naked and elongated. The chin barbels are usually absent, nasal barbels are usually present, and there are usually two pairs of maxillary barbels. Most of these fish have no adipose fin, and some also lack pelvic fins.

Many trichomycterids are small enough to be considered "miniatiurized" (do not exceed  SL). Miniaturization occurs in many of the trichomycterid subfamilies, including Trichomycterinae, Glanapteryginae, Vandelliinae (in Paravandellia), Tridentinae, and Sarcoglanidinae. Miniaturization has probably occurred four times in trichomycterid evolution, as the Glanapteryginae and Sarcoglanidinae are closely related and may have a single miniaturized ancestor.

Ecology
Though the family is commonly known as "parasitic catfishes", Trichomycteridae may actually include the widest range of trophic adaptations within any single catfish family. Only the two subfamilies Vandelliinae and Stegophilinae and  Tridensimilis of Tridentinae are considered to be parasitic fishes, including the infamous candirú or vampire catfish, feared by some people for its habit of entering into the urethra of humans. Apart from the free-living, generalized predators of small invertebrates, trophic modes represented by trichomycterids include the hematophagy (feeding on blood) in Vandelliinae, the lepidophagy (scales) and mucophagy (mucus) in some Stegophilinae and necrophagy (carrion) in others, and partial algivory (algae) in Copiondontinae.

Trichomycteridae include species that are active swimmers (Copionodontinae and Trichogeninae), torrent dwellers (Trichomycterinae), litter leaf dwellers (Ituglanis), and sand dwellers (Glanapteryginae and Sarcoglanidinae). Species may be restricted to elevations above 4000 m (13000 ft) in the Andes, Andean lakes, off-shore coastal islands, lowland species known only from large rapids, leaflitter puddles, and the bottom of torrential rivers. Trichomycterids are one of the most successful groups to occupy cave habitats; it contains 12 hypogean species. Such species include Ituglanis bambui, I. epikarsticus, I. passensis, I. ramiroi, and Silvinichthys bortayro. Six of the hypogean species are of the genus Trichomycterus: Trichomycterus chaberti, T. itacarambiensis, T. santanderensis, T. spelaeus, and T. uisae.

References

 
Catfish families
Fish of South America
Taxa named by Pieter Bleeker